John Opio (born 28 October 1951) is a Ugandan boxer. He competed in the men's light middleweight event at the 1972 Summer Olympics.

References

1951 births
Living people
Ugandan male boxers
Olympic boxers of Uganda
Boxers at the 1972 Summer Olympics
Place of birth missing (living people)
Light-middleweight boxers